This is a list of Royal Navy ship names starting with A.

A

 
 
 
 
 
 
 
 
 
 
 
 
 
 
 

 
  
 
 
 
 
 
 
 
 
 
 Abondance
 
 Abraham
 Abrams Offering
 
 
 
 
 
 
 
 Acertif
 
 
 
 
 
 
 
 Actaeon II
 Acteon
 
 
 
 
 
 
 Adamant II
 Adda
 
 
  
 
  
 
 Admiral de Vries
 Admiral DeVries
 Admiral Farragut
 
 
 
 
 
 
 
 
 
  
 
 
 Adviser
 
 
 
 
 
 
 
 
 
 
 Afrikander II
 
 
 
 
 
 
 
 
 
 
 Aimwell
 Ainthorpe
 
 
 
 
 Ajdaha
 
 Akers
 Alaart
 
  
  
 
 
 
 Alarm II
 
 Alaunia II
 
 
 Albanaise
 
 
 
 Albert
 
 Alberta
 
 Albion II
 Albion III
 
 
 
 
 
 
 
 
 
 
 
 
 
 Aldgate
 Aldington
 
 
 Alerte
 
 
 Alexandre
 
 
 Alfreda
 Alfriston
 
 
 
 Alice & Francis
 
 
 Allart
 
 Allepin
 
 
 
 
 
 
 
 
 
 
 
 
 
 
 
 
 Alverton
 
 
 
 
 
 
 
 
 
 
 Amberwitch
 Ambleside
 Amboyna
 
 
 
 
 
 
 Amersham
 Amerton
 
 
 
 Amitie
 Amity
 Amokura 
 
 
 
 
 
 
 Anacreon
 
 
 
 Andania
 
 
 
 
 
 Angel
 Angelica
 
 
 
 
 
 
 
 
 
 

 
 Anna Maria
 
 
 Annapolis
 
 
 
 
 Annet
 
 
 
  
  
 Antares
 
 
 Anthony Bonaventure
 
 
 Antwerp
 
 Anzio
 
 
  
 
  
 
 Appleton
  
 Aquarius
 
 
 
 
 Aragonite
 
 
 Arbella
 
 Arbroath
 Arbuthnot
 
  
 Arc-en-Ciel
 
 
 
 
 
 
 Arethuse
 
 
 
 
  
 
 
 
 
 
 

 
 
 
 
 
 
 Arms of Holland
 Arms of Horn
 
 Arms of Terver
 
 Arnprior
 Aro
 
 Arras
 Arrernte
 
 
 Arromanches
 
 
 
 
 Artifex
 Artigo
 
 
 
 Arve Princen
 
 
  
 
 Ashburton
 
 
 
 
  
 
 Assam
 Assault
 
 
 
 
 
 
  
 
 
 
 Astrea
 Astree
 
 
 
 
 
 
 Atheleney
 
 Athenian
 Athenien
 
 
 
 
  
 
 
 
 
 Attentive II
 
 
 Audacieux
 
 
 
 Auguste
 Augustine
 Augustus
 
 
 
 
 Aurore
 
  
 
 
 Autumn
 
 
 Aventurier
 
 
 
  
 Awe
 
  
 
 Ayrshire

See also
 List of aircraft carriers of the Royal Navy
 List of amphibious warfare ships of the Royal Navy
 List of pre-dreadnought battleships of the Royal Navy
 List of dreadnought battleships of the Royal Navy
 List of battlecruisers of the Royal Navy
 List of cruiser classes of the Royal Navy
 List of destroyer classes of the Royal Navy
 List of patrol vessels of the Royal Navy
 List of frigate classes of the Royal Navy
 List of monitors of the Royal Navy
 List of mine countermeasure vessels of the Royal Navy (includes minesweepers and mine hunters)
 List of Royal Fleet Auxiliary ship names
 List of submarines of the Royal Navy
 List of survey vessels of the Royal Navy
 List of Royal Navy shore establishments

Notes

References
 

 A
Names A
Royal Navy A
Royal Navy ships A